Doris Chase may refer to:

 Doris Chase (Arrowverse)
 Doris Chase (DC Comics)
 Doris Totten Chase (1923–2008), American artist